Denis Smyth (born 1948) is  professor of History at the University of Toronto. His doctorate is from the University of Cambridge. While at Cambridge he studied under F.H. Hinsley, a noted scholar of the Second World War. He is a specialist in modern international relations, particularly the period surrounding World War II and the Spanish Civil War.  Among his major works is  a monumental collected edition of previously classified  British documents from the period just after World War II.

Publications

Edited document collections
British Documents on Foreign Affairs, Western Europe: 1940-1945, 8 vols. (1998); and
British Documents on Foreign Affairs, Europe: 1946-1950, 27 vols. (2000–2003).

Scholarly Books
Deathly Deception: The Real Story of Operation Mincemeat Oxford: Oxford University Press, 2010.
Diplomacy and strategy of survival : British policy and Franco's Spain, 1940-41 Cambridge [Cambridgeshire] ; New York : Cambridge University Press, 1986. 
British documents on foreign affairs—reports and papers from the Foreign Office confidential print. by Paul Preston; Michael Partridge; Denis Smyth [Bethesda, Md.] : University Publications of America, ©2000.
Spain, the EEC, and NATO by Paul Preston;  Denis Smyth; Boston : Routledge & K. Paul [for] the Royal Institute of International Affairs, 1984. 
Translated into Spanish as  España ante la CEE y la OTAN by Paul Preston; Denis Smyth Barcelona : Grijalbo, 1985.

Book Chapters
"Battleground of reputations : Ireland and the Spanish Civil War" in The Republic Besieged: Civil War in Spain 1936-1939 ed. by Paul Preston &  Ann L Mackenzie. Edinburgh University Press, 1996. 
"Reflex reaction : Germany and the onset of the Spanish Civil War" in Revolution and war in Spain, 1931-1939  ed. by Paul Preston  New York : Methuen, 1984. 
"Politics of asylum, Juan Negrin and the British government in 1940" in Diplomacy and intelligence during the Second World War ed. by F H Hinsley;  Richard Langhorne.  Cambridge University Press, 1985.

Articles
 "The Dispatch of the Spanish Blue Division to the Russian Front: Reasons and Repercussions" European History Quarterly 1994 24(4): 537-553
 "Franco Cunctator" International History Review 1996 18(3): 629-64
 "Our Man in Havana, Their Man in Madrid: Literary Invention in Espionage Fact and Fiction" Intelligence and National Security 1990 5(4): 117-135
 "Screen Torch: Allied Counter-Intelligencve and Spanish Threat to the Secrecy of the Allied Invasion of French North Africa in November, 1942."  Intelligence and National Security   1989 4(2): 335-356.
 "Franco and World War II History Today 1985 35(Nov): 10-15
 "Duce Diplomatico [Diplomatic leader]".  Historical Journal 1978 21(4): 981-1000

External links
Faculty Profile at University of Toronto

1948 births
Academic staff of the University of Toronto
Living people
Alumni of the University of Cambridge